The GNU Project is a free software, mass collaboration project announced by Richard Stallman on September 27, 1983. Its goal is to give computer users freedom and control in their use of their computers and computing devices by collaboratively developing and publishing software that gives everyone the rights to freely run the software, copy and distribute it, study it, and modify it. GNU software grants these rights in its license.

In order to ensure that the entire software of a computer grants its users all freedom rights (use, share, study, modify), even the most fundamental and important part, the operating system (including all its numerous utility programs) needed to be free software. According to its manifesto, the founding goal of the project was to build a free operating system, and if possible, "everything useful that normally comes with a Unix system so that one could get along without any software that is not free." Stallman decided to call this operating system GNU (a recursive acronym meaning "GNU's not Unix!"), basing its design on that of Unix, a proprietary operating system. Development was initiated in January 1984. In 1991, the Linux kernel appeared, developed outside the GNU project by Linus Torvalds, and in December 1992 it was made available under version 2 of the GNU General Public License. Combined with the operating system utilities already developed by the GNU project, it allowed for the first operating system that was free software, commonly known as Linux.

The project's current work includes software development, awareness building, political campaigning, and sharing of new material.

Origins 

Richard Stallman announced his intent to start coding the GNU Project in a Usenet message in September 1983. Despite never having used Unix prior, Stallman felt that it was the most appropriate system design to use as a basis for the GNU Project, as it was portable and "fairly clean".

When the GNU project first started they had an Emacs text editor with Lisp for writing editor commands, a source level debugger, a yacc-compatible parser generator, and a linker. The GNU system required its own C compiler and tools to be free software, so these also had to be developed. By June 1987, the project had accumulated and developed free software for an assembler, an almost finished portable optimizing C compiler (GCC), an editor (GNU Emacs), and various Unix utilities (such as ls, grep, awk,  make and  ld). They had an initial kernel that needed more updates.

Once the kernel and the compiler were finished, GNU was able to be used for program development. The main goal was to create many other applications to be like the Unix system. GNU was able to run Unix programs but was not identical to it. GNU incorporated longer file names, file version numbers, and a crashproof file system. The GNU Manifesto was written to gain support and participation from others for the project. Programmers were encouraged to take part in any aspect of the project that interested them. People could donate funds, computer parts, or even their own time to write code and programs for the project.

The origins and development of most aspects of the GNU Project (and free software in general) are shared in a detailed narrative in the Emacs help system. (C-h g runs the Emacs editor command describe-gnu-project.) It is the same detailed history as at their web site.

GNU Manifesto 

The GNU Manifesto was written by Richard Stallman to gain support and participation in the GNU Project. In the GNU Manifesto, Stallman listed four freedoms essential to software users: freedom to run a program for any purpose, freedom to study the mechanics of the program and modify it, freedom to redistribute copies, and freedom to improve and change modified versions for public use. To implement these freedoms, users needed full access to the source code. To ensure code remained free and provide it to the public, Stallman created the GNU General Public License (GPL), which allowed software and the future generations of code derived from it to remain free for public use.

Philosophy and activism 

Although most of the GNU Project's output is technical in nature, it was launched as a social, ethical, and political initiative. As well as producing software and licenses, the GNU Project has published a number of writings, the majority of which were authored by Richard Stallman.

Free software 

The GNU project uses software that is free for users to copy, edit, and distribute. It is free in the sense that users can change the software to fit individual needs. The way programmers obtain the free software depends on where they get it. The software could be provided to the programmer from friends or over the Internet, or the company a programmer works for may purchase the software.

Funding 

Proceeds from associate members, purchases, and donations support the GNU Project.

Copyleft 

Copyleft is what helps maintain free use of this software among other programmers. Copyleft gives the legal right to everyone to use, edit, and redistribute programs or programs' code as long as the distribution terms do not change. As a result, any user who obtains the software legally has the same freedoms as the rest of its users do.

The GNU Project and the Free Software Foundation sometimes differentiate between "strong" and "weak" copyleft. "Weak" copyleft programs typically allow distributors to link them together with non-free programs, while "strong" copyleft strictly forbids this practice. Most of the GNU Project's output is released under a strong copyleft, although some is released under a weak copyleft or a lax, push-over free software license.

Operating system development 

The first goal of the GNU project was to create a whole free-software operating system. Because UNIX was already widespread and ran on more powerful machines, compared to contemporary CP/M or MS-DOS machines of time, it was decided it would be a Unix-like operating system. Richard Stallman later commented that he considered MS-DOS "a toy".

By 1992, the GNU project had completed all of the major operating system utilities, but had not completed their proposed operating system kernel, GNU Hurd. With the release of the Linux kernel, started independently by Linus Torvalds in 1991, and released under the GPLv2 with version 0.12 in 1992, for the first time it was possible to run an operating system composed completely of free software. Though the Linux kernel is not part of the GNU project, it was developed using GCC and other GNU programming tools and was released as free software under the GNU General Public License. Most compilation of the Linux kernel is still done with GNU toolchains, but it is currently possible to use the Clang compiler and the LLVM toolchain for compilation.

GNU/Linux 

A stable version (or variant) of GNU can be run by combining the GNU packages with the Linux kernel, making a functional Unix-like system. The GNU project calls this GNU/Linux, and the defining features are the combination of:

 GNU packages (except for GNU Hurd) The GNU packages consist of numerous operating system tools and utilities (shell, coreutils, compilers, libraries, etc.) including a library implementation of all of the functions specified in POSIX System Application Program Interface (POSIX.1). The GCC compiler can generate machine-code for a large variety of computer-architectures.
 Linux kernel – this implements program scheduling, multitasking, device drivers, memory management, etc. and allows the system to run on a large variety of computer-architectures. Linus Torvalds released the Linux kernel under the GNU General Public License in 1992; it is however not part of the GNU project.
 non-GNU programs – various free software packages which are not a part of the GNU Project but are released under the GNU General Public License or another FSF-approved Free Software License.

Within the GNU website, a list of projects is laid out and each project has specifics for what type of developer is able to perform the task needed for a certain piece of the GNU project. The skill level ranges from project to project but anyone with background knowledge in programming is encouraged to support the project.

The packaging of GNU tools, together with the Linux kernel and other programs, is usually called a Linux distribution (distro). The GNU Project calls the combination of GNU and the Linux kernel "GNU/Linux", and asks others to do the same, resulting in the GNU/Linux naming controversy.

Most Linux distros combine GNU packages with a Linux kernel which contains proprietary binary blobs.

GNU Free System Distribution Guidelines 

The GNU Free System Distribution Guidelines (GNU FSDG) is a system distribution commitment used to explain what it means for an installable system distribution (such as a Linux distribution) to qualify as free (libre), and help distribution developers make their distributions qualify.

Mostly, the list describes distributions that are a combination of GNU packages with a Linux-libre kernel (a modified Linux kernel that removes binary blobs, obfuscated code, and portions of code under proprietary licenses) and consist only of free software (eschewing proprietary software entirely). Distributions that have adopted the GNU FSDG include Dragora GNU/Linux-Libre, gNewSense, GNU Guix System, Hyperbola GNU/Linux-libre, Parabola GNU/Linux-libre, Trisquel GNU/Linux, Ututo, and a few others.

The Fedora Project's distribution license guidelines were used as a basis for the FSDG. The Fedora Project's own guidelines, however, currently do not follow the FSDG, and thus the GNU Project does not consider Fedora to be a fully free (libre) GNU/Linux distribution.

Strategic projects 

From the mid-1990s onward, with many companies investing in free software development, the Free Software Foundation redirected its funds toward the legal and political support of free software development. Software development from that point on focused on maintaining existing projects, and starting new projects only when there was an acute threat to the free software community. One of the most notable projects of the GNU Project is the GNU Compiler Collection, whose components have been adopted as the standard compiler system on many Unix-like systems.

The copyright of most works by the GNU Project is owned by the Free Software Foundation.

GNOME 
The GNOME desktop effort was launched by the GNU Project because another desktop system, KDE, was becoming popular but required users to install Qt, which was then proprietary software. To prevent people from being tempted to install KDE and Qt, the GNU Project simultaneously launched two projects. One was the Harmony toolkit. This was an attempt to make a free software replacement for Qt. Had this project been successful, the perceived problem with the KDE would have been solved. The second project was GNOME, which tackled the same issue from a different angle. It aimed to make a replacement for KDE that had no dependencies on proprietary software. The Harmony project didn't make much progress, but GNOME developed very well. Eventually, the proprietary component that KDE depended on (Qt) was released as free software. GNOME has since dissociated itself from the GNU Project and the Free Software Foundation; and is now independently managed by the GNOME Project.

GNU Enterprise 

GNU Enterprise (GNUe) is a meta-project started in 1996, and can be regarded as a sub-project of the GNU Project. GNUe's goal is to create free "enterprise-class data-aware applications" (enterprise resource planners, etc.). GNUe is designed to collect Enterprise software for the GNU system in a single location (much like the GNOME project collects Desktop software).

Recognition 
In 2001, the GNU Project received the USENIX Lifetime Achievement Award for "the ubiquity, breadth, and quality of its freely available redistributable and modifiable software, which has enabled a generation of research and commercial development".

See also 

 Free Software Foundation
 GNU Free Documentation License
 List of GNU packages
 9965 GNU

References

External links 

 
 The GNU Free Software Directory
 GNU Enterprise

 
1983 establishments in the United States
Copyleft media
Copyright law
Free Software Foundation
Free software movement